Delta Theta Tau is a non-college, non-sectarian, community based sorority founded on October 16, 1903, in Muncie, Indiana. Delta Theta Tau was the first non-sectarian sorority. Members are only required to "believe in a higher power."  Today, Delta Theta Tau has 72 chapters in the United States and over 50 alumnae chapters in the United States and Canada.

History
In the early 1900s it was very common for Greek letter organizations to form in high schools. Many of the high school organizations did not extend past their immediate schools. Delta Theta Tau would become much more.

The organization began as the Tyrolean Club. The Founders were:
 Nora Spurgeon Charman
 Olive Spurgeon Gage
 Ethel Busch Lesh
 Betsy Gordon Gibert
 Charlene Prutzman Rector

On October 16, 1903, the name was changed to Delta Theta Tau, a name chosen at the home of Betsy Gordon.  That evening there was much to discuss. Ethel Busch was chosen as their leader, olive green and white for colors, and they drew up a constitution. With the motto, "Grit Wins", the motto of their high school class, they had a new organization. Initially the organization was solely social in nature. They celebrated their new organization that evening with an oyster supper prepared by Mrs. Gordon.  The first pledges were Bess Staigers, Charline Knapp Murray, Anna Hilling, Della Ault and Florence Jackson.

The Beta chapter was installed on February 9, 1905 in Elwood, Indiana. Also in 1905, Winnie Hartley of Muncie, Indiana designed the badge, which has remained the same ever since.  Nora Spurgeon Charman was the first of the founders to die and it was in her honor that the founders' names would be included in the ritual. The first convention was held in 1906. In 1907 the third chapter was installed in Tipton, Indiana. By 1913, there were 11 active chapters.

The sorority's newsletter, Grit, was first published in 1917. By 1920, Delta Theta Tau had 18 chapters. Today there are 71 active chapters total, as well as 53 alumnae chapters.

Philanthropy
Delta Theta Tau Sorority is a service sorority and raises money through various efforts for many different charities. Over the last ten years, Delta Theta Tau has contributed a great deal of time and money to the National Foundation for Ectodermal Dysplasias (NFED). The ectodermal dysplasia (ED) syndromes are a group of about 150 charitable disorders that affect the ectoderm, the outer layer of tissue in a developing baby. ED syndromes affect both males and females of all races and ethnic groups.

The ectoderm contributes to the formation of many parts of the body, including the skin, sweat glands, hair, teeth, and nails. During embryonic development, these and/or other parts of the baby's body, including the lens of the eye, parts of the inner ear, the fingers and toes, or nerves, among others, may fail to develop normally.

When a child has at least two types of abnormal ectodermal features—for example, malformed teeth and extremely sparse hair—the child is identified as being affected by an ED "syndrome."  Each of the roughly 150 ED syndromes represents a different combination of abnormalities. Physical symptoms can range from mild to extremely severe. Very few types of ED involve learning difficulties.

The Delta Theta Tau Golden Hand Fund
The Delta Theta Tau Golden Hand Fund is a non-profit entity within the organization that provides charitable contributions to various philanthropies.

Delta Home
Delta Theta Tau is unique in that it has a separate fund that is used for members entering their golden years who experience financial difficulties. Delta Home provides anonymous assistance to members who apply.

Mission statement
Delta Theta Tau Sorority, Inc. is a national women's organization dedicated to the advancement of philanthropy and charity, nonsectarian, nonacademic, promoting welfare for all and fostering the spirit of good fellowship.

Honorary members
 Shirley Temple Black, actress
 Eve Joestring
 Patricia Koch
 Imogene Jones Long
 Mary Pickford
 Jodi Edgar Reinhardt (NFED)
 Helen Lawrence Scott
 Beth Wallis
 Lura Lee Whitesell

References

 www.deltathetatau.org
 Golden Years of Delta Theta Tau
 Silver Years of Delta Theta Tau
 Diamond Years of Delta Theta Tau' by Teresa McAllister
 Grit Quarterly Publication of Delta Theta Tau
 Interviews with the 2004-2005 National Council, 2005-2006 National Council, and members of the Zeta Zeta Chapter
 www.nfed.org
 NFED fundraising director

External links
 Delta Theta Tau Official Webpage

1903 establishments in Indiana
Fraternities and sororities in the United States
Student organizations established in 1903